Fostertown is an unincorporated community located within Lumberton Township in Burlington County, New Jersey, United States. The site was founded in 1735 by William Foster, who established a plantation on modern-day West Bella Bridge Road. The area is largely farmland with some houses and a high-voltage power line dotting the landscape.

Transportation
County Route 541 is a major road that travels through the center of Fostertown.

The Flying W Airport is south of Fostertown, partially in Lumberton Township and neighboring Medford. The South Jersey Regional Airport is another airport located west of Fostertown.

References

Lumberton Township, New Jersey
Unincorporated communities in Burlington County, New Jersey
Unincorporated communities in New Jersey